Shirdi Assembly constituency is one of the 288 Vidhan Sabha (Legislative Assembly) constituencies of Maharashtra state in Western India.

Overview
Shirdi (constituency number 218) is one of the twelve Vidhan Sabha constituencies located in the Ahmednagar district. It comprises part of Rahata tehsil and part of the  Sangamner tehsil of the district.

Shirdi is part of the Shirdi Lok Sabha constituency along with five other Vidhan Sabha segments in this district, namely Akole, Sangamner, Kopargaon, Shrirampur and Nevasa.

Members of Legislative Assembly

 1962: Karbhari Bhimaji Rohamare, Indian National Congress
 1967: M. A. Gade, Indian National Congress
 1972: Shankarrao Genuji Kolhe, Indian National Congress
 1978: Chandrabhan Bhausaheb Ghogare, Indian National Congress
 1980: Annasaheb Mhaske, Indian National Congress
 1985: Annasaheb Mhaske, Indian National Congress
 1990: Annasaheb Mhaske, Indian National Congress
 1995: Radhakrishna Vikhe Patil, Indian National Congress
 1997: Radhakrishna Vikhe Patil, Shiv Sena
 1999: Radhakrishna Vikhe Patil, Indian National Congress
 2004: Radhakrishna Vikhe Patil, Indian National Congress
 2009: Radhakrishna Vikhe Patil, Indian National Congress
 2014: Radhakrishna Vikhe-Patil, Indian National Congress
 2019: Radhakrishna Vikhe Patil, Bharatiya Janata Party

See also
 Shirdi
 List of constituencies of Maharashtra Vidhan Sabha

References

Assembly constituencies of Maharashtra
Shirdi
Year of establishment missing